The participation of China in the ABU TV Song Festival has occurred seven times since the inaugural ABU TV Song Festival began in 2012. Since their début in 2012, the Chinese entry has been organised by the national broadcaster China Central Television (CCTV).

History

2012
CCTV is one of the founder members in the ABU TV Song Festivals, having participated in the very first ABU TV Song Festival 2012. CCTV internally selected Cao Fujia to sing in Seoul, she performed "Qian gua (牵挂)" on stage.

2013
On 15 June 2013 it was confirmed that China would participate in the second ABU TV Song Festival in Hanoi, Vietnam. The Group Zheng Qi Dou Yan (Splendid 7) was made up of 7 national minorities from across China, Uighur, Mongolian, Korean, Yi, Zhuang, Tibetan and Hui. At the festival in Hanoi, the group performed "Love Will Keep Us Together".

2014
On 1 September 2014 it was confirmed that China would participate for a third time in the ABU TV Song Festival. On 24 September 2014 it was confirmed that Bibi Zhou would represent China with "I Miss You Missing Me", the song was released four years earlier in 2010.

2015
On 19 August 2015 it was announced that China would not participate in the fourth edition of the ABU TV Song Festival in Istanbul, Turkey. The reason for withdrawal was not given.

Participation overview

See also 
China in the ABU Radio Song Festival

References 

Countries at the ABU Song Festival